Hakone Turnpike, is a 15.752 km toll road in Kanagawa Prefecture, Japan, connecting Odawara with Yugawara, via Hakone. 

Hakone Turnpike opened as an important bypass road of Hakone Shindō, the busy, mountainous part of National Route 1, on February 16, 1955. It is now owned by Central Nippon Expressway Company's Hakone Turnpike subsidiary.

See also   
Ashinoko Skyline, another toll road in the Hakone area

References

External link

 Hakone Turnpike in Japanese

Hakone, Kanagawa
Yugawara, Kanagawa
Roads in Kanagawa Prefecture